Luka Japaridze (born 6 September 1998 in Tbilisi, Georgia) is a rugby union player who currently plays for Lelo Saracens in the Didi 10 and also plays internationally for Georgia U20 as a prop.

References

External links

1998 births
Living people
Rugby union players from Georgia (country)
Rugby union props
Rugby union players from Tbilisi
Lelo Saracens players